An activity in Unified Modeling Language (UML) is a major task that must take place in order to fulfill an operation contract. The Student Guide to Object-Oriented Development defines an activity as a sequence of activities that make up a process. Activities can be represented in activity diagrams

An activity can represent:
 The invocation of an operation.
 A step in a business process.
 An entire business process. 
Activities can be decomposed into subactivities, until at the bottom we find atomic actions. 

The underlying conception of an activity has changed between UML 1.5 and UML 2.0. In UML 2.0 an activity is no longer based on the state-chart rather it is based on a Petri net like coordination mechanism. There the activity represents user-defined behavior coordinating actions. Actions in turn are pre-defined (UML offers a series of actions for this).

Unified Modeling Language